An Ideal Husband, also known as Oscar Wilde's An Ideal Husband, is a 1947 British comedy film adaptation of the 1895 play by Oscar Wilde. It was made by London Film Productions and distributed by British Lion Films (UK) and Twentieth Century-Fox Film Corporation (USA). It was produced and directed by Alexander Korda from a screenplay by Lajos Bíró from Wilde's play. The music score was by Arthur Benjamin, the cinematography by Georges Périnal, the editing by Oswald Hafenrichter and the costume design by Cecil Beaton.  This was Korda's last completed film as a director, although he continued producing films into the next decade.

The film stars Paulette Goddard, Michael Wilding, Diana Wynyard, Hugh Williams, C. Aubrey Smith, Glynis Johns and Constance Collier.

Plot
The story takes place in London, 1895. The main characters are Mrs. Laura Cheveley (Paulette Goddard), who has recently returned to Britain after living in Vienna; Sir Roger Chiltern (Hugh Williams), a government minister with a reputation for honesty; his wife Lady Gertrude (Diana Wynyard), who disapproves strongly of immorality and dishonesty; Mabel Chiltern (Glynis Johns), Sir Robert's younger sister; Lord Arthur Goring (Michael Wilding), an unmarried and unconventional young man; and his father, the Earl of Caversham (C. Aubrey Smith), who is eager to have his son marry and settle down.

At a lavish party hosted by the Chilterns, Mrs. Cheveley tries to extort Sir Roger into supporting a bill to provide government financing for what he considers to be a fraudulent scheme. Mrs. Cheveley has incriminating letters that he wrote many years earlier that allowed him to use advance knowledge of the financing of the Suez Canal to establish his fortune and career. He initially refuses but gives in to save his reputation.  Before leaving the party, Mrs. Cheveley tells Lady Gertrude, a former schoolmate, that her husband will support the canal scheme, which surprises the politician's wife.  As the party ends, Arthur and Mabel notice an unusual brooch that someone had lost. Goring knows that he had given that brooch to someone in the past and keeps it, hoping that it will be asked for. Sir Roger, confronted by his wife about his change of position, writes a letter to Lady Cheverley to tell her that he will speak against the bill.

The next morning, Sir Robert reveals Lady Cheveley's blackmail attempt to Arthur, who urges him to let his wife know about his own past indiscretion, even if it will ruin her regard for her husband.  Sir Robert refuses to tell her the truth and decides to look for some way to blackmail Mrs. Cheveley instead. Arthur, who was once engaged to her, thinks that plan will not work. Mrs. Cheveley arrives to ask if anyone has found a brooch she had lost at the party. Lady Gertrude tells the woman that she has despised her dishonesty ever since they were in school together and that Sir Robert will speak against the bill in Parliament that night. Mrs. Cheveley retaliates by telling her how her husband made his fortune. Sir Robert orders Mrs. Cheveley to leave. His wife is repelled by his past behavior and he responds saying that no one could live up to the ideal image she had of him.

That evening, Lady Gertrude writes an unsigned note to Arthur asking for his help. Arthur tells Mrs. Cheveley that he has her brooch and knows that she stole it from an important society woman. He removes the incriminating brooch when she gives him the letter she was using to blackmail Sir Robert. She, however, takes Lady Gertrude's note as she leaves, planning to use it to make Sir Robert believe that his wife is having an affair with Arthur. Lady Gertrude in turn now says that she has learned the power of forgiveness.

That night, Mrs. Cheveley watches from the women's gallery in the House of Commons as Sir Robert denounces the canal scheme. The next day, Lord Caversham again admonishes his son, Arthur, to marry. Arthur complies and proposes to Mabel. Lady Gertrude arrives and Arthur tells her of Mrs. Cheveley's intention to destroy her marriage, using the unsigned note. When she gives it to Sir Robert, though, he takes the letter to be proof his of wife's need and love for him. Now willing to give up his position in society and live a contented life with Lady Gertrude, Sir Robert is offered an important Cabinet position by Lord Caversham. Arthur persuades her to let her husband remain in public life. Lady Cheveley leaves, not apparently upset that her schemes have failed.

Cast
 Paulette Goddard as Mrs. Laura Cheveley
 Michael Wilding as Viscount Arthur Goring
 Diana Wynyard as Lady Gertrude Chiltern
 Hugh Williams as Sir Robert Chiltern
 C. Aubrey Smith as Earl of Caversham, Goring's Father
 Glynis Johns as Miss Mabel Chiltern, Sir Robert's sister
 Constance Collier as Lady Markby
 Christine Norden as Mrs. Margaret Marchmont
 Harriette Johns as Olivia, Countess of Basildon
 Michael Medwin as Duke of Nonesuch
 Michael Anthony as Vicomte de Nanjac
 Peter Hobbes as Mr. Eddie Montford
 John Clifford as Mr. Mason, the Chiltern Butler
 Fred Groves as Phipps, Goring's Butler
 Michael Ward as Mr. Tommy Tafford

Production
The costly production was held up due to a strike by the crew. The union objected to American actress Paulette Goddard's personal, Swedish-born hairdresser, claiming an English person could do the job.  Korda was also criticized for halting shooting to procure a genuine emerald necklace for Goddard to wear in one scene, a controversial extravagance during Britain's post-war austerity period. However, Korda's use of the Royal Household Cavalry in an outdoor scene was so impressive that the company wore the uniforms from the film for the royal wedding of Princess Elizabeth to Philip, Duke of Edinburgh.

Shooting took 66 days. Goddard's husband, Burgess Meredith, was making Mine Own Executioner for Korda at the same time. After filming, the two of them appeared on stage in Dublin in Winterset.

Reception
The film, along with two others from Korda, Mine Own Executioner and Anna Karenina, as well as other British films, were picketed in some American cities by the Sons of Liberty Boycott Committee, headed by Johan J. Smertenko, who was active in supporting the establishment of the State of Israel.  The group wanted to draw American attention to British policies in the Palestine Mandate. Korda, however, suggested that the boycott might also be used by American interests in retaliation for distribution quotas imposed on American films by Britain.  The film's American distributor, Twentieth Century Fox, did pull Korda's films from its theaters.  Smertenko and the Sons of Liberty announced an end to the boycott in December 1948.

Box Office
The film was one of the most popular movies at the British box office in 1948. According to Kinematograph Weekly, the most successful at the box office in 1948 Britain was The Best Years of Our Lives, with Spring in Park Lane being the best British film and next best being It Always Rains on Sunday, My Brother Jonathan, Road to Rio, Miranda, An Ideal Husband, Naked City, The Red Shoes, Green Dolphin Street, Forever Amber, Life with Father, The Weaker Sex, Oliver Twist, The Fallen Idol and The Winslow Boy.

However, it performed disappointingly in other markets.

References

External links
 
 
 

1947 films
Films directed by Alexander Korda
London Films films
British films based on plays
Films based on works by Oscar Wilde
Films produced by Alexander Korda
British comedy films
1947 comedy films
1940s English-language films
1940s British films